Zion Lutheran Church is a church in Appleton, Wisconsin affiliated with the Evangelical Lutheran Church in America. It was added to the National Register of Historic Places in 1986 for its architectural significance.

References

Churches on the National Register of Historic Places in Wisconsin
Lutheran churches in Wisconsin
Churches completed in 1902
Gothic Revival church buildings in Wisconsin
Churches in Appleton, Wisconsin
National Register of Historic Places in Outagamie County, Wisconsin